Bibi Johns is a Swedish singer and film actress active in Germany.

Filmography

 Ten on Every Finger (1954)
 How Do I Become a Film Star? (1955)
 Ball at the Savoy (1955)
 A Thousand Melodies (1956)
 Beneath the Palms on the Blue Sea (1957)
 When She Starts, Look Out (1958)
 La Paloma (1959)

References

Bibliography
 Lutz Peter Koepnick. The Cosmopolitan Screen: German Cinema and the Global Imaginary, 1945 to the Present. University of Michigan Press, 2007.

External links

1929 births
Living people
Swedish film actresses
20th-century Swedish women singers
Swedish expatriates in Germany